Peter Alexander Pender (August 10, 1936 – November 18, 1990) was an American bridge player and figure skater from Forestville, California. He died of AIDS in  San Francisco, California.

Pender, who was born in Pennsylvania, an elite figure skater who won gold medals from both the U.S. and Canadian Figure Skating Associations. In the late 1950s he traveled frequently to Montreal for skating competition, and met his 1980s bridge partner Hugh Ross there. He moved to San Francisco in 1960.

In 1966 Pender and Jeremy Flint, who had played for Great Britain in the 1965 Bermuda Bowl world championship, were regular partners in American Contract Bridge League (ACBL) competition after Flint arrived to tour the US in mid-February. "Flint created a sensation" by achieving the rank of ACBL Life Master in 11 weeks. They finished first and second in total masterpoints earned during the calendar year, recognized by the annual McKenney Trophy.

Pender was inducted into the ACBL Hall of Fame in 1998.

Bridge accomplishments

Honors

 ACBL Hall of Fame, 1998
 McKenney Trophy, 1966

Wins

 North American Bridge Championships (14)
 Nail Life Master Open Pairs (2) 1967, 1984 
 Grand National Teams (4) 1982, 1983, 1985, 1987 
 Vanderbilt (2) 1984, 1987 
 Marcus Cup (1) 1958 
 Reisinger (5) 1968, 1970, 1981, 1985, 1986

Runners-up

 North American Bridge Championships
 Rockwell Mixed Pairs (1) 1964 
 North American Pairs (1) 1985 
 Mitchell Board-a-Match Teams (2) 1966, 1972 
 Reisinger (2) 1971, 1983 
 Spingold (1) 1974

References

External links
 
 

1936 births
1990 deaths
American contract bridge players
American male single skaters
AIDS-related deaths in California
LGBT figure skaters
People from Forestville, California
20th-century American LGBT people